The West Babylon Union Free School District is a school district in Long Island, New York. It has its headquarters in West Babylon.

History

In July 1988 voters approved the spending of $297,606 ($ when adjusted for inflation) to buy eight school buses, with six with capacities of 60 passengers, one with a capacity of 30 passengers, and one with a capacity of 16 passengers. This vote was approved 891 to 762. In addition, voters approved the school district budget 930 to 731 the same day; the previous month the original budget proposal had not been passed by voters.

Schools
 West Babylon Senior High School
 West Babylon Junior High School
Elementary schools:
 Forest Avenue Elementary School
 John F. Kennedy Elementary School
 Santapogue Elementary School
 South Bay Elementary School
 Tooker Avenue Elementary School

References

External links

West Babylon Union Free School District

School districts in New York (state)
Babylon (town), New York